Karsenty is a surname. Notable people with the surname include:

Bernard Karsenty (1920–2007), member of the French Resistance during World War II
Gérard Karsenty, American geneticist
Philippe Karsenty (born 1966), French media analyst